John Thomas Byrne MBE (24 January 1903 – 5 December 1969) was a Scottish trade union leader and anti-communist activist.

Byrne was born in Uphall, West Lothian, to Irish parents John Byrne, a shale miner, and Catherine Doonan, who were married in Broxburn in 1900. Byrne worked as an electrician and joined the Electrical Trades Union (ETU).  He became the union's Glasgow area secretary, a post he held for eighteen years.  In 1948, he stood to become assistant general secretary of the union, losing to Frank Haxell, a member of the Communist Party of Great Britain (CPGB).  In 1955, the general secretaryship of the union became available, and he again stood against Haxell and was defeated.  He claimed that CPGB members in the union were fixing elections.  In this, he gained substantial support, particularly from Les Cannon, a CPGB member who resigned after the Soviet invasion of Hungary, Labour Party Members of Parliament John Freeman and Woodrow Wyatt and the Catholic Action movement.

In 1956 Byrne was awarded an MBE in the New Year Honours for his services as an Area Secretary to the Electrical Trades Union in West Scotland.

Byrne stood against Haxell again in 1959, and was widely expected to win.  However, it was declared that he had narrowly lost the election.  He and Frank Chapple took Haxell and fourteen other CPGB members to court, alleging that the election had been fixed.  In 1961, they won the case and the court declared Byrne elected as general secretary.  Byrne expelled Haxell from the union but did not agree to a Trades Union Congress (TUC) demand to bar all existing officers from office for five years.  As a result, the ETU were expelled from the TUC and, later, also from the Labour Party.

Byrne organised new elections and was re-elected as general secretary, with his supporters winning almost all the elected posts.  They banned communists from holding elected office in the union, and the ETU was subsequently readmitted to the TUC and Labour Party.

Byrne suffered a stroke in 1961 and was thereafter concerned about his health.  He decided to retire in 1966, when his full term of office ended, and he died three years later.

References

1903 births
1969 deaths
Scottish people of Irish descent
Scottish anti-communists
General Secretaries of the Electrical Trades Union (United Kingdom)
Trade unionists from Glasgow